The Pokrok Západu (the Progress of the West in English) was a Czech language newspaper in Nebraska, running issues from 1871 to 1920. It was the first Czech newspaper in the state, and in 1900, began sponsoring other Czech language newspapers in other locations, such as in Minnesota. It was founded by Edward Rosewater, sold to Jan Rosický in 1877, and sold again in 1920, when it stopped further publication.

Founding and dissolution 
The Pokrok Západu (in English meaning Progress of the West) was founded in 1871 by Edward Rosewater, a Jewish immigrant, who after coming to Omaha had founded the Omaha Daily Bee. The first Czech language newspaper in Nebraska, it was at first designed for advertisements of land to prospective settlers in the state. It was supported by American railroad companies. In 1887, it was sold to Jan Rosický, an immigrant who had come to Omaha in the 1870s to edit the paper. Under Rosický, the newspaper became a place for Czechs to inform one another; he used it to influence Czech migrations across the American midwest. While most Czech Nebraskans in politics were Democratic, the paper was Republican in orientation. Editors of the paper included Vaclav Snajder, V. A. Jung, F. J. Kutak, Jaroslav Albert Havranek, and Otakar Charvat.

Rosický also published other papers, such as the Czech language Kvety Americke (American Blossoms), a literary magazine containing original work by Czech Americans, and the Hospoddář (the Farmer), which became the largest-circulating agricultural magazine in Czech in the world, and which aided in Czech settlement to the United States. From 1876 to 1890, the Pokrok Západu was the official paper of the Czech Farmers' Mutual Aid Society in Nebraska, a group that helped settlers in the state. From 1890 to its dissolution in 1893, the mutual aid society was represented by the Nova Doba in Schuyler. In 1900, the Pokrok Publishing Company was formed, which published local Czech language papers in other locations, such as Iowa (Iowsky Pokrok), Minnesota (Minnesotsky Pokrok), and Wilber, Nebraska (Wilbersky Tydenik, the Wilber Weekly). From 1915 to 1920, the Pokrok Západu was a daily paper, before it was sold to the Hlasatel of Chicago; in 1920, it ceased publication. It was the longest-running Czech newspaper in the United States.

The motto of the paper was "pilne sluzic zajmu narodnimu, hledet chci vzdy k vzdelani obecnemu": "While ever serving  national interest let me give heed always to the education of all".

References

Citations

Bibliography

 
 
 
 
 

1871 establishments in Nebraska
1920 disestablishments
Czech-language newspapers published in the United States
Defunct newspapers published in Nebraska
Non-English-language newspapers published in Nebraska